UAAP Season 76 is the 2013–2014 athletic year of the University Athletic Association of the Philippines. It was hosted by Adamson University with Fr. Maximino D. Rendon, C.M. as president. There were eight universities that competed in fifteen sports with poomsae, a form in the sport of taekwondo now recognized as a regular sport and included in the general championship tally.

Some of the sporting events were aired live or on a delayed telecast by ABS-CBN Channel 2 and Studio 23. All the men's basketball games and the women's volleyball games were aired live by ABS-CBN Sports, the former for the fourteenth consecutive year and the latter since Season 69. Starting this season, ABS-CBN Sports will air on Friday afternoons: one men's volleyball game (1-3 pm, on a delayed basis) and one live men's football game (3-5 pm). On January 18, 2014, the UAAP telecast transferred to ABS-CBN Sports+Action starting with women's volleyball after Studio 23 ceased its broadcast on January 17, 2014.

Opening ceremony
Season 76 opened on Saturday, June 29, 2013 at 12:30 P.M. at the Mall of Asia Arena with an elaborate and colorful opening ceremony patterned after the hit book "The Hunger Games". Its theme is "Greatness never ends".

Dancers representing the eight universities dressed up according to their school's identity, but taking a page from the book from which the opening ceremony was themed. The schools’ dancers wore hats, capes matching their university colors and giving off a tribal look, as they came out like the characters from the Districts. The others were dressed in over-the-top outfits, looking like the people from the Capitol — as in the movie. Adamson, this year's host of the UAAP, had the most elaborate introduction in the opening as they showcased huge birds with feathers of white and blue.

The opening ceremony was followed by two men's basketball games, University of the East versus Far Eastern University and De La Salle University against University of Santo Tomas.

The June start, compared to the usual July opening of past seasons, was due to the decision of the UAAP to suspend its basketball games while the 2013 FIBA Asia Championship was running from August 1–11, 2013. This gave way to the country's hosting of the continental caging as requested by the Samahang Basketbol ng Pilipinas.

Sports calendar

1st semester sports (June–October)
 June
 Basketball
 August 
 Beach volleyball 
 Badminton 
 September
 Judo 
 Taekwondo 
 Poomsae 
 Table Tennis 
 Swimming 
 Cheerdance

2nd semester sports (November–March)
 November
 Football 
 December
 Volleyball 
 Softball 
 Track and Field 
 Fencing 
 January
 Baseball 
 Tennis 
 Chess

Basketball

The UAAP Season 76 basketball tournament began on June 29, 2013 at the Mall of Asia Arena. The tournament host was Adamson University and tournament commissioner was Joaquin "Chito" Loyzaga.

Seniors division

Men's tournament

Elimination round

Team standings

Playoffs

Awards
 Most Valuable Player: 
 Rookie of the Year:

Women's tournament

Elimination round

Team standings

Playoffs

Awards
 Most Valuable Player: 
 Rookie of the Year:

Juniors division

Juniors' tournament

Elimination round

Team standings

Playoffs

Awards
 Most Valuable Player: 
 Rookie of the Year:

Volleyball

The UAAP Season 76 volleyball tournament started on December 1, 2013 at the Araneta Coliseum. The tournament host of the seniors' division is Adamson University while University of the East is tournament host for the juniors' division. The number of participating schools in the girls' tournament increased to six with Adamson University fielding a girls' volleyball team this season.

The UAAP uses the number of wins as the primary criterion for ranking teams. Adamson and La Salle, which were tied with 7 wins in the men's tournament, had a playoff to determine the #4 seed, despite La Salle having more points (23) than Adamson (21); the same happened for Adamson (19 points) and FEU (17 points), which were tied for 4th in the women's tournament with 6 wins.

Seniors division

Men's tournament

Elimination round

Team standings

Playoffs

Awards
 Most Valuable Player: 
 Rookie of the Year:

Women's tournament

Elimination round

Team standings

Playoffs

Awards
 Most Valuable Player: 
 Rookie of the Year:

Juniors division

Boys' tournament

Elimination round

Team standings

|}

Awards
 Most Valuable Player: 
 Rookie of the Year:

Girls' tournament

Elimination round

Team standings

|}

Awards
 Most Valuable Player: 
 Rookie of the Year:

Beach volleyball
The UAAP Season 76 beach volleyball tournament began on August 31, 2013 at the University of the East (UE) sand courts in Caloocan, Metro Manila. The tournament host is University of the East.

Men's tournament

Elimination round

Team standings

 

Match-up results

Playoffs

Awards
 Most Valuable Player: 
 Rookie of the Year:

Women's tournament

Elimination round

Team standings

Match-up results

Playoffs

Awards
 Most Valuable Player: 
 Rookie of the Year:

Football
The UAAP Season 76 football tournament began on November 23, 2013 at the football field of the Far Eastern University in Diliman, Quezon City. The tournament host is Far Eastern University.

Men's tournament

Elimination round

Team standings

Match-up results

Playoffs

Awards
 Most Valuable Player: 
 Rookie of the Year:

Women's tournament

Elimination round

Team standings

Match-up results

Awards
 Most Valuable Player: 
 Rookie of the Year:

Boys' tournament

Elimination round

Team standings

Match-up results

Awards
 Most Valuable Player: 
 Rookie of the Year:

Baseball
The UAAP Season 76 baseball tournament began on January 5, 2014 at the Rizal Memorial Baseball Stadium in Malate Manila. The tournament host is University of Santo Tomas.

Men's tournament

Elimination round

Team standings

Match-up results

Finals

Ateneo wins series 2–0

Awards
 Most Valuable Players: 
 Rookie of the Year:

Boys' tournament

Elimination round

Team standings

Match-up results

Awards
 Most Valuable Player: 
 Rookie of the Year:

Softball
The UAAP Season 76 softball tournament began on December 4, 2013 at the baseball diamond of the Rizal Memorial Sports Complex in Malate Manila. The tournament host is University of Santo Tomas.

Women's tournament

Elimination round

Team standings

Match-up results

Finals

Adamson wins series in two games

Awards
 Most Valuable Player: 
 Rookie of the Year:

Badminton
The UAAP Season 76 badminton tournament began on September 1, 2013 at the Jumpsmash Badminton Center in Quezon City. The tournament host is National University.

Men's tournament

Elimination round

Team standings

 

Match-up results

Playoffs

Awards
 Most Valuable Player: 
 Rookie of the Year:

Women's tournament

Elimination round

Team standings

Note: Tiebreaker was head-to-head records (matches won-lost) among tied teams.

Match-up results

Playoffs

Awards
 Most Valuable Player: 
 Rookie of the Year:

Table tennis
The UAAP Table Tennis tournament began on September 14, 2013 at the Blue Eagle Gym of the Ateneo de Manila University in Katipunan Ave., Loyola Heights, Quezon City. The tournament host is Ateneo de Manila University.

Seniors division

Men's tournament

Elimination round

Team standings

Incomplete Win–loss data

Match-up results

Awards
 Most Valuable Player: 
 Rookie of the Year:

Women's tournament

Elimination round

Team standings
 
Incomplete Win–loss data

Match-up results

Playoffs

Awards
 Most Valuable Player: 
 Rookie of the Year:

Juniors division

Boys' tournament

Elimination round

Team standings
 
Incomplete Win–loss data

Match-up results

Playoffs

Awards
 Most Valuable Player: 
 Rookie of the Year:

Tennis
The UAAP Tennis tournament began on January 11, 2014 at the Olivarez College Tennis Courts in Parañaque. The tournament host is National University.

Men's tournament

Elimination round

Awards
 Most Valuable Player: 
 Rookie of the Year:

Women's tournament

Elimination round

Awards
 Most Valuable Player: 
 Rookie of the Year:

Judo
The UAAP Judo Championships ran from September 28–29, 2013 at the Blue Eagle Gym of the Ateneo de Manila University in Katipunan Ave., Loyola Heights, Quezon City. The tournament host is Ateneo de Manila University.

Seniors division

Men's tournament

Team standings

Awards
 Most Valuable Player: 
 Rookie of the Year:

Women's tournament

Team standings

 To break Ateneo and UE's tie, the number of Ippons were counted.

Awards
 Most Valuable Player: 
 Rookie of the Year:

Juniors' division

Boys' tournament

Team standings

Awards
 Most Valuable Player: 
 Rookie of the Year:

Taekwondo
The UAAP Season 76 Taekwondo tournament began on September 4, 2013 at the Filoil Flying V Arena in San Juan City, Metro Manila. The tournament host is Far Eastern University.

Seniors division

Men's tournament

Team standings
 Season host in boldface.

Awards
 Most Valuable Player: 
 Rookie of the Year:

Women's tournament

Team standings
 Season host in boldface.

Awards
 Most Valuable Player: 
 Rookie of the Year:

Juniors' division

Boys' tournament

Team standings
 Season host in boldface.

Awards
 Most Valuable Player: 
 Rookie of the Year:

Poomsae
The inaugural UAAP Poomsae tournament as a regular sport was held on September 13, 2013, at the Filoil Flying V Arena in San Juan City, Metro Manila. Poomsae was a demonstration sport starting with Season 74 (2011–12).

Medal table

Medal Winners

Swimming
The UAAP swimming championships was held on September 19–22, 2013 at the Trace Aquatics Centre in Los Baños, Laguna. The men's and women's divisions are now six member-school tournaments with the participation of Adamson starting this season. After the four-day tournament, there was a total of 34 new UAAP records that were established: 7 in the men's division, 12 in women's, 10 in boys', and 5 in girls'.

Ranking is determined by a point system, similar to that of the overall championship. The points given are based on the swimmer's/team's finish in the finals of an event, which include only the top eight finishers from the preliminaries. The gold medalist(s) receive 15 points, silver gets 12, bronze has 10. The following points: 8, 6, 4, 2 and 1 are given to the rest of the participating swimmers/teams according to their order of finish.

Seniors division

Men's tournament

Team standings

Awards
 Most Valuable Player: 
 Rookie of the Year:

Women's tournament

Team standings

Awards
 Most Valuable Player: 
 Rookie of the Year:

Juniors division

Boys' tournament

Team standings

Awards
 Most Valuable Player: 
 Rookie of the Year:

Girls' tournament

Team standings

Awards
 Most Valuable Player: 
 Rookie of the Year:

Cheerdance
The UAAP Cheerdance Competition was held on September 15, 2013 at the SM Mall of Asia Arena. The event host was University of Santo Tomas. Cheerdance competition is an exhibition event. Points for the general championship are not awarded to the participants.

Team standings
 
Order - refers to order of performance

 Stunner award: Ana De Leon - DLSU Animo Squad

Group stunts competition

General championship summary 
The general champion is determined by a point system. The system gives 15 points to the champion team of a UAAP event, 12 to the runner-up, and 10 to the third placer. The following points: 8, 6, 4, 2 and 1 are given to the rest of the participating teams according to their order of finish.

Medals table

Seniors' division

Juniors' division

General championship tally

Seniors' division

Juniors' division

See also
NCAA Season 89

References

 
76
2013 in Philippine sport
2014 in Philippine sport